Sri GVG Visalakshi College for Women, is a women's general degree college located at Udumalpet, Tiruppur District, Tamil Nadu. It was established in the year 1952. The college is affiliated with Bharathiar University. This college offers different courses in arts, commerce and science.

Departments

Science
Physics
Chemistry
Mathematics
Computer Science
Computer Applications
Information technology
Botany
Zoology

Arts and Commerce
Tamil
English
History
Economics
Economics with Logistics and Freight Management
Library Science
Physical Education
Commerce
ecommerce
Commerce with Computer Applications

Accreditation
The college is  recognized by the University Grants Commission (UGC).

References

External links

Educational institutions established in 1952
1952 establishments in Madras State
Colleges affiliated to Bharathiar University
Academic institutions formerly affiliated with the University of Madras